Audrey Skirball-Kenis (December 19, 1914 – June 19, 2002) was an American philanthropist.

Early years
Audrey Skirball-Kenis was born Audrey Marx in Birmingham, Alabama, the daughter of Otto Marx Sr., and Agnes Mosler Marx.  Her father's banking business was an early tenant of the eponymous Brown Marx Building in downtown Birmingham, Alabama.

Raised in New York City, as the daughter of a Paris-born mother, she spoke French at home until she began school. In 1941, the day after Pearl Harbor was bombed, Audrey moved to California to join the Signal Corps.

Audrey had two brief marriages that ended in divorce before, marrying film producer and real estate developer Jack Skirball. The couple were deeply involved in philanthropy, largely in support of Reform Judaism. They planned and funded the construction of the Skirball Cultural Center. Jack died in 1985, shortly before the center opened.

In 1987 Audrey married wine importer Charles Kenis. Together they established the Audrey Skirball-Kenis Center for Plastic and Reconstructive Surgery at Cedars-Sinai Medical Center, as well as being involved in a variety of other philanthropic projects.

A long-time horse racing fan, Audrey Skirball had joined with friends in 1972 to purchase a thoroughbred, then established the 3 Plus U Stable, which became quite successful.  Charles Kenis joined his new wife in this pursuit and became a founder and eventually director emeritus of the Thoroughbred Owners of California.

ASK
Audrey and Charles founded the non-profit Audrey Skirball-Kenis Theater Projects (ASK) in West Los Angeles. Audrey did not actively manage ASK, but Charles served as president of ASK's board of trustees.

In 1990, Audrey and Charles, through ASK, made a highly publicized donation of $500,000 to the Los Angeles Arts Festival's theater and performance programs. The donation saved the festival from closing, and was ceremonially accepted in the Los Angeles mayor's office by Peter Sellers, the festival's director.

Soon, ASK emerged with a reputation as Los Angeles' primary funder of small new theatrical projects. In 2000, ASK spent and gave a total of $1.8 million to charitable activities.

Death
Audrey Skirball-Kenis died on June 19, 2002, at age 87 in Los Angeles. She had two daughters, and two stepchildren. Charles Kenis died in Los Angeles on July 21, 2006.

References

Sources
Audrey Skirball-Kenis, Philanthropist, 87, Dies (Associated Press, June 25, 2002)
Turmoil and uncertainty rock an L.A. art mainstay, L.A. Weekly, June 14–20, 2002

1914 births
2002 deaths
American people of French-Jewish descent
People from New York City
Military personnel from Birmingham, Alabama
People from Los Angeles
United States Army soldiers
American Reform Jews
Women in the United States Army
American women in World War II
20th-century American philanthropists
20th-century American people